The following list of Carnegie libraries in Maine provides detailed information on United States Carnegie libraries in Maine, where 18 public libraries were built from 18 grants (totaling $241,450) awarded by the Carnegie Corporation of New York from 1901 to 1912. In addition, academic libraries were built at 2 institutions (totaling $70,000).

Key

Public libraries

Academic libraries

Notes

References

Note: The above references, while all authoritative, are not entirely mutually consistent. Some details of this list may have been drawn from one of the references without support from the others.  Reader discretion is advised.

External links
New England Carnegies

Maine
Libraries
Libraries